Feroleto della Chiesa is a comune (municipality) in the Province of Reggio Calabria in the Italian region Calabria, located about  southwest of Catanzaro and about  northeast of Reggio Calabria.

Geography
The municipality of Feroleto della Chiesa contains the frazione (subdivision) Plaesano.

Feroleto della Chiesa borders the following municipalities: Anoia, Galatro, Laureana di Borrello, Maropati, Melicucco, Rosarno.

Demographic evolution

References

Cities and towns in Calabria